Abderraouf Ben Aziza (born 23 September 1953) is a Tunisian football forward who played for Tunisia in the 1978 FIFA World Cup. He also played for Étoile Sportive du Sahel. He also played for Al-Nassr for 3 years from 1978 until 1981 and won the Saudi League twice, in 1980 and 1981.

References

External links

1953 births
Living people
Tunisian footballers
Tunisia international footballers
Association football forwards
Saudi Professional League players
Étoile Sportive du Sahel players
Al Nassr FC players
1978 FIFA World Cup players
1978 African Cup of Nations players
Mediterranean Games bronze medalists for Tunisia
Mediterranean Games medalists in football
Competitors at the 1975 Mediterranean Games
Expatriate footballers in Saudi Arabia
Tunisian expatriate sportspeople in Saudi Arabia